The Pallad (also known as the wz. 1974) is a 40 mm Polish underslung grenade launcher, developed for use with the AKM assault-rifle and intended to replace the kbkg wz. 1960 grenade-launcher rifle. The name of the weapon reflects the Polish-language word for palladium.

The development of the weapon drew on concepts provided by Józef Brodacki.

The wz. 1983 Pallad D, the stand-alone version of the wz. 74, features a stock and AK type pistol grip.

There are also variants compatible with 40x46mm NATO named GP-40 (40x46mm version of wz. 74 Pallad) and GS-40 (40x46mm version of wz. 83 Pallad-D).

Users
 – 10 (5,56mm karabinek-granatnik wz. 1974) were given from Poland and in use by Lithuania before 2003
 – 7,62mm karabinek-granatnik wz. 1974 (limited use), 5,45mm karabinek-granatnik wz. 1974 (phased out), 5,56mm karabinek-granatnik wz.1974 and wz. 83 Pallad-D are in use by Polish Land Forces

References

40×47mm grenade launchers
Grenade launchers of Poland
Military equipment introduced in the 1970s